SEASPRAY was a joint U.S. Army special operations and CIA clandestine aviation unit. It was established in 1981, and now forms part of Delta Force.

History

The CIA and U.S. Army decided to establish SEASPRAY in March 1981 as part of an expansion of the Army's covert special forces capability. The company-sized unit was initially equipped with unmarked Hughes 500D helicopters which were modified for their role, and was based at Fort Eustis in Virginia. The unit later also acquired Cessna and Beechcraft King Air fixed-wing aircraft. In line with typical CIA practices, these helicopters and aircraft were not included in the official register of U.S. Army aircraft and were instead registered as belonging to a company called Aviation Tech Services. The existence of SEASPRAY did not become publicly known until 1985.

In April 1981 a SEASPRAY helicopter flew Lebanese Christian leader Bachir Gemayel from Cairo to Lebanon as the first stage of a trip to the United States. From 1982 until 1985 SEASPRAY fixed-wing aircraft conducted signals intelligence sorties over Honduras. In the early 1980s the Army rejected a proposal from the CIA that SEASPRAY aircraft be used to follow small aircraft which were potentially being used to smuggle weapons from Nicaragua to El Salvador. The CIA conducted this operation using civilian aircrews instead. SEASPRAY established a base at Tampa, Florida to support its operations in Central America. SEASPRAY has also been reported to have assisted the CIA to "obtain, exploit and spoof foreign aircraft and technology".

Michael Smith's 2011 book Killer Elite states that SEASPRAY was placed under the control of the Intelligence Support Activity (ISA) at an unspecified date. Following this change the unit was renamed the Flight Concepts Division, and operated under the code name "Quasar Talent". As of the time the book was published, the unit was reported to form part of the Joint Special Operations Command and was used to covertly transport ISA, CIA, Delta Force and SEAL Team Six personnel.

Sean Naylor's 'Relentless Strike' reported in 2015 that the unit became, E Squadron, Delta Force in 1989.

References

Further reading 
 Steven Emerson, Secret Warriors: Inside the Covert Military Operations of the Reagan Era, G.P. Putnam's Sons, New York, 1988. 

Special operations units and formations of the United States Army